Dastak may refer to:

 Dastak (1970 film), a Hindi film
 Dastak (1996 film), a Hindi-language Indian film
 Dastak, Iran, a village in Dehgah Rural District, Gilan Province, Iran
 Dastak (trade permit) a permit given to European traders in India by Mughal emperors.
 Mohammad Ali Ramazani Dastak (1963–2020), Iranian politician